"On the Wings of Love" is a song by Jeffrey Osborne from his self-titled debut album released in 1982. Written alongside Peter Schless, the song was the second single from the album.

"On the Wings of Love" peaked at No. 29 on the U.S. Billboard Hot 100, No. 13 R&B, and No. 7 Adult Contemporary. It did well in the UK, where it reached No. 11. It also hit No. 1 on the Canadian Adult Contemporary chart.

The song became his biggest hit in the United Kingdom. Meanwhile in the United States, it was his biggest hit since the L.T.D. song "Back in Love Again", on which he was the lead singer.

Personnel
Jeffrey Osborne - lead vocals, vocal arrangements, rhythm arrangements, background vocals
George Duke - rhythm arrangements, piano
Michael Sembello - guitar
Steve Ferrone - drums
Abraham Laboriel, Sr. - bass

Chart history

Weekly charts

References

External links
 

1982 songs
1982 singles
Jeffrey Osborne songs
Pop ballads
A&M Records singles
1980s ballads
Song recordings produced by George Duke
Songs written by Jeffrey Osborne